The 2022 European Rowing Championships were held from 11 to 14 August 2022 in Munich, Germany as part of the multi-sport 2022 European Championships. 

The event constituted 19 events in rowing and 4 in pararowing.

Medal table

Medal summary

Men

Women

Mixed para-rowing events

Participating countries

References

External links
 Results book 

European Rowing Championships
2022
Rowing competitions in Germany
European Rowing Championships
European Rowing Championships
Sport in Munich
2022 European Championships